An Comunn Gàidhealach (literally "The Gaelic Association"), commonly known as An Comunn, is a Scottish organisation that supports and promotes the Scottish Gaelic language and Scottish Gaelic culture and history at local, national and international levels. The society is closely associated with the Royal National Mòd. The symbol used for An Comunn Gàidhealach is the Irish Sunburst flag at the top also a symbol associated in Irish mythology and the Celtic harp on the bottom right.

History
It was founded in Oban in 1891 to help preserve and develop the Gaelic language and to establish the Royal National Mòd (Scottish Gaelic: Am Mòd Nàiseanta Rìoghail), a festival of Gaelic music, arts and culture modelled originally on the National Eisteddfod of Wales. Today An Comunn encourages the teaching, learning and use of the Gaelic language, and the study and cultivation of Gaelic literature, history, music and art. 

From 1905 to 1922 An Comunn Gàidhealach published a monthly magazine titled an Deo-Grèine. This was replaced in 1923 by An Gaidheal (literally "The Gael") which ran until 1967, when it was continued by the bilingual newspaper Sruth until 1970.

Kenneth MacIver was appointed assistant director in 1974.

Its offices are in Inverness and its Patron is Queen Elizabeth II. The organisation should not be confused with An Comunn Gàidhealach America, the Comunn na Gàidhlig, or the Bòrd na Gàidhlig.

See also
Conradh na Gaeilge
Manx Gaelic Society

References

Bibliography

External links
Website of An Comunn Gàidhealach
Website of An Comunn Gàidhealach Ameireaganach
Website of the Gaelic Society of Inverness, another body with similar aims
Website of The Association of Gaelic Choirs
Volume 1 of Deò-ghrèine

Organisations based in Inverness
Scottish Gaelic language